Maria Kirilenko and Nadia Petrova were the defending champions. Both were present that year, but chose to compete with different players.
Kirilenko partnered with Elena Vesnina, but lost in the second round to Nuria Llagostera Vives and María José Martínez Sánchez.
Petrova partnered with Bethanie Mattek-Sands, but lost in the quarterfinals to Cara Black and Liezel Huber.
Cara Black and Liezel Huber won in the final 6–3, 0–6, 10–2 against Nuria Llagostera Vives and María José Martínez Sánchez.

Seeds
The top four seeds receive a bye into the second round.

Draw

Finals

Top half

Bottom half

Women's Open - Doubles